Dual specificity phosphatase 6 (DUSP6) is an enzyme that in humans is encoded by the DUSP6  gene.

Function 

The protein encoded by this gene is a member of the dual specificity protein phosphatase subfamily. These phosphatases inactivate their target kinases by dephosphorylating both the phosphoserine/threonine and phosphotyrosine residues. They negatively regulate members of the mitogen-activated protein (MAP) kinase superfamily (MAPK/ERK, SAPK/JNK, p38), which are associated with cellular proliferation and differentiation. Different members of the family of dual specificity phosphatases show distinct substrate specificities for various MAP kinases, different tissue distribution and subcellular localization, and different modes of inducibility of their expression by extracellular stimuli. This gene product inactivates ERK2, is expressed in a variety of tissues with the highest levels in heart and pancreas and, unlike most other members of this family, is localized in the cytoplasm. Two transcript variants encoding different isoforms have been found for this gene. Upregulation of MKP-3 has been shown to alleviate chronic postoperative pain.

Interactions 

DUSP6 has been shown to interact with MAPK3.

References

Further reading

External links 
 

EC 3.1.3